Miroslav Matušovič (born 2 November 1980) is a former Czech footballer. He was an attacking midfielder, left winger or second striker, who last played for Apollon Limassol. His strengths were his dangerous left-foot, dribbling skills and pace.

He started his career in Havířov. In 1996 - 2005 he  played for FC Baník Ostrava, with whom he won the Czech First League in the 2003/04 season. In January 2005 he signed a contract with Sparta Prague. Matušovič scored a goal in his first UEFA Champions League appearance against Ajax Amsterdam on 28 September 2005. In the summer of 2009 he left Sparta and went to Cyprus to play for Apollon Limassol. In 2011, he signed a short-term contract at boyhood club Havířov, playing in the Czech Fourth Division, but in July of the same year he returned to Limassol on a new contract.

Honours
With Baník Ostrava:
 Gambrinus Liga: 2003/04
With Apollon Limassol:
 Cypriot Cup: 2009/10

References

External links
 
 

1980 births
Living people
Czech footballers
Czech expatriate footballers
FC Baník Ostrava players
AC Sparta Prague players
Apollon Limassol FC players
Czech First League players
Cypriot First Division players
Expatriate footballers in Cyprus
People from Havířov
Association football midfielders
Sportspeople from the Moravian-Silesian Region